Nordbahnhof (North railway station) may refer to:

Austria
 Wien Praterstern railway station, formerly known as Wien Nordbahnhof (Vienna North railway station)
Germany
 Berlin Nordbahnhof
 Berlin Old Nordbahnhof
 Bochum-Nord station
 Braunschweig Nord station, Braunschweig
 Darmstadt Nord station
 Ingolstadt Nord station
 Strausberg Nord station
 Stuttgart Nord station
Switzerland
 Bern Bümpliz Nord railway station
 Bischofszell Nord railway station
 Grenchen Nord railway station
 Kehrsatz Nord railway station
 Sarnen Nord railway station

See also
 
 North Station (disambiguation)
 Estación del Norte (disambiguation)
 Gare du Nord (disambiguation)